President of the Landtag of Saxony

In the 1831–1918 period, Saxony had a bicameral legislature. It consisted of the I Chamber and the II Chamber.

President of Sächsicher Volkskammer

Presidents of the Landtag of Saxony

President of the Beratende Versammlung

Presidents of the Landtag of Saxony

References 

Landtag,Presidents
Lists of legislative speakers in Germany